Karl Jordan may refer to:  

 Karl Jordan (footballer)
 Karl Jordan (zoologist, born 1861)
 Karl Jordan (zoologist, born 1888), also an Olympic gymnast

See also
Carl Jordan (disambiguation)